Papyrus 19 (in the Gregory-Aland numbering), signed by 𝔓19, is an early copy of the New Testament in Greek. The manuscript paleographically has been assigned to the 4th or 5th century.

The papyrus is currently housed at the Bodleian Library, Gr. bibl. d. 6 (P) at the University of Oxford.

Description 
Papyrus 19 is a papyrus manuscript of the Gospel of Matthew, containing text for Matthew 10:32-11:5. The leaf is complete at the top and bottom, but broken at the sides.

The Greek text of this codex is a representative of the Alexandrian text-type. Aland placed it in Category II.

Text 
Matthew 10:32-40
 [32] – . [33] 

Matthew 10:41-11:5
  –

Notable Readings 

Matthew 10:37b (and the person loving their son or daughter more than me is not worthy of me) is omitted, as in B* D 983 syrh Codex Schøyen

Matthew 10:38 is omitted, as in M*

Matthew 10:37b-38 is also omitted in the Hebrew Shem Tov Matthew manuscript.

See also
List of New Testament papyri

References

Further reading

External links
 P. Oxy. 1170 at the Oxyrhynchus online

New Testament papyri
4th-century biblical manuscripts
Bodleian Library collection
Gospel of Matthew papyri